Evan Williams may refer to:


People

In sport
 Evan O. Williams (c. 1889–1946), American football and basketball coach
 Evan Williams (footballer) (born 1943), Scottish football goalkeeper
 Evan Williams (jockey) (1912–2001), horse racing jockey and trainer
 Evan Williams (rugby) (1906–1976), rugby union and rugby league footballer of the 1920s
 Evan Williams (squash player) (born 1989), New Zealand squash player

Other
 Evan James Williams (1903–1945), Welsh physicist
 Evan Williams (actor), Canadian actor and musician
 Evan Williams (diplomat), Australian diplomat and Administrator of the Australian Indian Ocean Territories
 Evan Williams (Internet entrepreneur) (born 1972), entrepreneur, Blogger and Twitter co-founder
 Evan Williams (journalist), Australian speechwriter, winner of the Pascall Prize Lifetime Achievement Award
 Evan Williams (tenor) (1867–1918), American singer
 Sir Evan Williams, 1st Baronet (1871–1959), Welsh industrialist
 Owen Williams (engineer) (Evan Owen Williams, 1890–1969), British engineer and architect

Other
 Evan Williams (whiskey), brand of bourbon whiskey